The 2010 WNBA season was the 11th season for the Seattle Storm of the Women's National Basketball Association. The Storm won their second WNBA championship.

Transactions

Dispersal draft
Based on the Storm's 2009 record, they would pick 10th in the Sacramento Monarchs dispersal draft. The Storm picked Chelsea Newton.

WNBA Draft
The following are the Storm's selections in the 2010 WNBA Draft.

Transaction log
February 4: The Storm signed Chelsea Newton.
February 9: The Storm signed free agent Le'coe Willingham.
March 3: The Storm signed Jana Vesela to a training camp contract.
March 11: The Storm re-signed Lauren Jackson.
March 17: The Storm signed Davanei Hampton to a training camp contract.
April 1: The Storm signed Abby Bishop, Laura Kurz and Aja Parham to training camp contracts.
April 6: The Storm signed Lindsey Wilson to a training camp contract.
April 8: The Storm announced that Katie Gearlds would sit out the 2010 season.
April 14: The Storm signed Loree Moore to a training camp contract.
April 20: The Storm signed Ashley Robinson and Heather Bowman to training camp contracts.
April 22: The Storm signed Svetlana Abrosimova and released Janell Burse.
April 30: The Storm waived Tanisha Smith.
May 6: The Storm waived Heather Bowman.
May 10: The Storm waived Devanei Hampton and Lindsey Wilson.
May 11: The Storm waived Laura Kurz.
May 14: The Storm waived Aja Parham, Loree Moore and Ashley Walker.

Free agents

Additions

Subtractions

Roster

Depth

Season standings

Schedule

Preseason

|- align="center" bgcolor="bbffbb"
| 1 || May 2 || 4:00pm || Phoenix || 77–58 || Walker (17) || Walker (6) || Lacey (5) || KeyArena  4,912 || 1–0
|- align="center" bgcolor="ffbbbb"
| 2 || May 9 || 2:00pm || @ Tulsa || 80–90 || Jackson (15) || Cash (7) || Wright (4) || BOK Center  N/A || 1–1
|-

Regular season

|- align="center" bgcolor="bbffbb"
| 1 || May 16 || 9:00pm || Los Angeles || KONG || 81–67 || Jackson (23) || Jackson (10) || Bird (4) || KeyArena  9,686 || 1–0
|- align="center" bgcolor="bbffbb"
| 2 || May 19 || 10:00pm || Minnesota || KING || 79–76 || Cash (24) || Jackson (8) || Bird (10) || KeyArena  6,687 || 2–0
|- align="center" bgcolor="bbffbb"
| 3 || May 22 || 10:00pm || @ Phoenix ||  || 95–89 (OT) || Jackson (25) || Wright (9) || Bird (8) || US Airways Center  10,144 || 3–0
|- align="center" bgcolor="bbffbb"
| 4 || May 25 || 10:00pm || Washington ||  || 82–76 || Bird, Wright (16) || Jackson (7) || Bird (7) || KeyArena  6,612 || 4–0
|- align="center" bgcolor="ffbbbb"
| 5 || May 27 || 8:00pm || @ Chicago || CN100 || 75–84 || Jackson (15) || Jackson (11) || Bird (4) || Allstate Arena  2,923 || 4–1
|- align="center" bgcolor="bbffbb"
| 6 || May 30 || 3:00pm || @ San Antonio ||  || 84–56 || Jackson (27) || Cash (8) || Bird (6) || AT&T Center  4,924 || 5–1
|-

|- align="center" bgcolor="bbffbb"
| 7 || June 1 || 9:30pm || Atlanta || ESPN2 || 90–72 || Jackson (32) || Jackson (10) || Bird (6) || KeyArena  7,586 || 6–1
|- align="center" bgcolor="bbffbb"
| 8 || June 5 || 11:00pm || @ Los Angeles || NBATVFS-W || 79–75 || Bird (22) || Jackson (9) || Bird (6) || Home Depot Center  6,026 || 7–1
|- align="center" bgcolor="bbffbb"
| 9 || June 6 || 9:00pm || Phoenix || KONG || 97–74 || Cash, Jackson, Little (16) || Abrosimova (7) || Bird (11) || KeyArena  7,827 || 8–1
|- align="center" bgcolor="bbffbb"
| 10 || June 11 || 10:00pm || Los Angeles || KONG || 82–60 || Jackson (17) || Jackson (9) || Bird (5) || KeyArena  7,286 || 9–1
|- align="center" bgcolor="ffbbbb"
| 11 || June 17 || 7:00pm || @ Indiana || FS-I || 65–72 || Jackson (17) || Jackson (9) || Cash (4) || Conseco Fieldhouse  7,520 || 9–2
|- align="center" bgcolor="bbffbb"
| 12 || June 18 || 7:30pm || @ New York ||  || 92–84 || Bird (22) || Jackson (12) || Bird (10) || Madison Square Garden  8,883 || 10–2
|- align="center" bgcolor="bbffbb"
| 13 || June 20 || 9:00pm || San Antonio || NBATVFS-SW || 82–61 || Cash (22) || Jackson (14) || Wright (6) || KeyArena  8,086 || 11–2
|- align="center" bgcolor="bbffbb"
| 14 || June 25 || 10:00pm || Indiana ||  || 85–81 || Jackson (28) || Jackson (7) || Wright (10) || KeyArena  9,083 || 12–2
|- align="center" bgcolor="bbffbb"
| 15 || June 27 || 4:00pm || @ Tulsa || COX || 83–72 || Jackson (24) || Little (9) || Wright (10) || BOK Center  4,865 || 13–2
|- align="center" bgcolor="bbffbb"
| 16 || June 29 || 10:00pm || San Antonio ||  || 86–72 || Jackson (31) || Jackson (15) || Wright (12) || KeyArena  7,823 || 14–2
|-

|- align="center" bgcolor="bbffbb"
| 17 || July 3 || 5:00pm || @ Los Angeles || ESPN2 || 75–62 || Jackson (20) || Cash, Jackson (8) || Bird (7) || STAPLES Center  9,319 || 15–2
|- align="center" bgcolor="bbffbb"
| 18 || July 6 || 3:00pm || New York ||  || 78–70 || Cash (20) || Cash (11) || Little, Wright (4) || KeyArena  11,012 || 16–2
|- align="center" bgcolor="bbffbb"
| 19 || July 14 || 3:30pm || @ Phoenix || FS-A || 111–107 (3OT) || Jackson (31) || Jackson (18) || Bird (8) || US Airways Center  13,508 || 17–2
|- align="center" bgcolor="bbffbb"
| 20 || July 17 || 3:30pm || @ Minnesota ||  || 73–71 || Jackson (26) || Cash (11) || Wright (10) || Target Center  7,216 || 18–2
|- align="center" bgcolor="bbffbb"
| 21 || July 20 || 12:30pm || @ San Antonio || NBATVFS-SW || 80–74 || Jackson (21) || Cash, Jackson (7) || Wright (7) || AT&T Center  12,414 || 19–2
|- align="center" bgcolor="bbffbb"
| 22 || July 25 || 9:00pm || Tulsa || KONG || 75–59 || Jackson (16) || Willingham (10) || Bird, Wright (6) || KeyArena  9,686 || 20–2
|- align="center" bgcolor="bbffbb"
| 23 || July 27 || 9:30pm || Phoenix || ESPN2 || 91–85 || Jackson (33) || Jackson (11) || Bird (7) || KeyArena  8,044 || 21–2
|- align="center" bgcolor="bbffbb"
| 24 || July 29 || 10:00pm || Chicago || NBATVKONG || 80–60 || Cash (16) || Little, Willingham (7) || Bird (8) || KeyArena  7,749 || 22–2
|-

|- align="center" bgcolor="ffbbbb"
| 25 || August 1 || 7:00pm || @ Minnesota || NBATVFS-N || 71–72 || Bird (16) || Robinson (7) || Bird (10) || Target Center  7,312 || 22–3
|- align="center" bgcolor="ffbbbb"
| 26 || August 3 || 8:00pm || @ Tulsa || COX || 75–84 || Bird (19) || Bird (7) || Wright (7) || BOK Center  3,697 || 22–4
|- align="center" bgcolor="bbffbb"
| 27 || August 5 || 10:30pm || Connecticut || ESPN2 || 83–82 || Jackson (31) || Jackson (8) || Bird (6) || KeyArena  7,538 || 23–4
|- align="center" bgcolor="bbffbb"
| 28 || August 7 || 10:00pm || Tulsa || KONG || 111–65 || Abrosimova (20) || Jackson (10) || Abrosimova (8) || KeyArena  9,686 || 24–4
|- align="center" bgcolor="bbffbb"
| 29 || August 10 || 7:00pm || @ Atlanta || FS-S || 80–70 || Jackson, Wright (14) || Jackson (8) || Abrosimova (6) || Philips Arena  6,042 || 25–4
|- align="center" bgcolor="ffbbbb"
| 30 || August 13 || 7:30pm || @ Connecticut ||  || 68–88 || Abrosmiova (19) || Robinson (7) || Abrosimova (6) || Mohegan Sun Arena  9,197 || 25–5
|- align="center" bgcolor="ffbbbb"
| 31 || August 15 || 4:00pm || @ Washington ||  || 71–80 || Cash (15) || Abrosimova, Willingham (6) || Bird (7) || Verizon Center  9,438 || 25–6
|- align="center" bgcolor="bbffbb"
| 32 || August 17 || 10:00pm || Minnesota ||  || 68–64 || Jackson (24) || Little (14) || Bird (8) || KeyArena  7,394 || 26–6
|- align="center" bgcolor="bbffbb"
| 33 || August 20 || 10:00pm || @ Phoenix ||  || 78–73 || Cash (13) || Bird (7) || Bird (5) || US Airways Center  12,459 || 27–6
|- align="center" bgcolor="bbffbb"
| 34 || August 21 || 11:00pm || Los Angeles || ESPN2 || 75–74 || Little (22) || Cash (7) || Bird (9) || KeyArena  9,686 || 28–6
|-

| All games are viewable on WNBA LiveAccess

Postseason

|- align="center" bgcolor="bbffbb"
| 1 || August 25 || 11:00pm || Los Angeles || ESPN2 || 79–66 || Cash (20) || Jackson (9) || Bird (12) || KeyArena  10,589 || 1–0 
|- align="center" bgcolor="bbffbb"
| 2 || August 28 || 3:00pm || @ Los Angeles || ESPN2 || 81–66 || Jackson (24) || Jackson (9) || Cash (5) || STAPLES Center  8,326 || 2–0 
|-

|- align="center" bgcolor="bbffbb"
| 1 || September 2 || 10:00pm || Phoenix || NBATV || 82–74 || Jackson (23) || Jackson (17) || Bird (10) || KeyArena  9,686 || 1–0 
|- align="center" bgcolor="bbffbb"
| 2 || September 5 || 3:00pm || @ Phoenix || ABC || 91–88 || Cash (28) || Cash, Jackson, Little (8) || Bird (8) || US Airways Center  9,010 || 2–0
|-

|- align="center" bgcolor="bbffbb"
| 1 || September 12 || 3:00pm || Atlanta || ABC || 79–77 || Jackson (26) || Little (11) || Bird (8) || KeyArena  15,084 || 1–0 
|- align="center" bgcolor="bbffbb"
| 2 || September 14 || 9:00pm || Atlanta || ESPN2 || 87–84 || Jackson (26) || Little (9) || Bird (5) || KeyArena  13,898 || 2–0 
|- align="center" bgcolor="bbffbb"
| 3 || September 16 || 8:00pm || @ Atlanta || ESPN2 || 87–84 || Cash (18) || Jackson (9) || Bird (7) || Philips Arena  10,522 || 3–0 
|-

Statistics

Regular season

Awards and honors
Lauren Jackson was named WNBA Western Conference Player of the Week for the week of May 15, 2010.
Lauren Jackson was named WNBA Western Conference Player of the Week for the week of May 29, 2010.
Lauren Jackson was named WNBA Western Conference Player of the Week for the week of June 19, 2010.
Lauren Jackson was named WNBA Western Conference Player of the Week for the week of June 26, 2010.
Lauren Jackson was named WNBA Western Conference Player of the Week for the week of July 10, 2010.
Lauren Jackson was named WNBA Western Conference Player of the Month for May.
Lauren Jackson was named WNBA Western Conference Player of the Month for June.
Lauren Jackson was named WNBA Western Conference Player of the Month for July.
Sue Bird was named to the 2010 WNBA All-Star Team as a Team USA starter.
Swin Cash was named to the 2010 WNBA All-Star Team as a Team USA reserve.
Lauren Jackson was named to the 2010 WNBA All-Star Team as a WNBA reserve.
Tanisha Wright was named to the All-Defensive First Team.
Lauren Jackson was named to the All-Defensive Second Team.
Lauren Jackson was named to the All-WNBA First Team.
Sue Bird was named to the All-WNBA Second Team.
Brian Agler was named Coach of the Year.
Lauren Jackson was named Most Valuable Player.
Lauren Jackson was named Finals Most Valuable Player.

References

External links
2010: Record-Setting Storm Run

Seattle Storm seasons
Seattle
2010 in sports in Washington (state)
Western Conference (WNBA) championship seasons
Women's National Basketball Association championship seasons
Seattle Storm